Cauldon or Caldon is a village and former civil parish,  north east of Stafford, now in the parish of Waterhouses, in the Staffordshire Moorlands district, in the county of Staffordshire, England. In 1931 the parish had a population of 422.

History 
The name "Cauldon" means 'Calves' hill'. Cauldon was recorded in the Domesday Book as Caldone. On 1 April 1934 the parish was abolished to form Waterhouses.

Features 
Cauldon has a church called St. Mary and St. Laurence.

References 

Villages in Staffordshire
Former civil parishes in Staffordshire
Staffordshire Moorlands